Radharaman Dutta (1834 – 1915), also spelt as Radha Raman Dutta, was an influential Bengali musician and poet. A prominent member of the Bauls, Dutta's body of work has led him to be considered as the "Father of Dhamal songs", and Radharaman's Songs are widely covered by contemporary Bengali musicians and lyricist.

Ancestry
In 640, the Raja of Tripura Dharma Fa planned a ceremony and invited five Brahmans from Etawah, Mithila and Kannauj. To compensate for their long journey, the Raja granted the Brahmans land in a place which came to be known as Panchakhanda (meaning five parts). One of the five Brahmans, Ananda Shastri of Mithila, was the ancestor of Nidhipati Shastri. In 1195, the King of Tripura granted Nidhipati some land in Ita. Ita was feudal to the Kingdom of Tripura and part of its Manukul Pradesh. Nidhipati became the founder of the Ita dynasty which would later gain a Raja status through his descendant, Bhanu Narayan. Bhanu Narayan's son, Ramchandra Brahma Narayan had a son called Prabhakar Dutta. In 1612, after Khwaja Usman's successful battle against the last Ita Raja, Subid Narayan, the royal family fled to nearby kingdoms in the Sylhet region. Prabhakar fled to Alisarkul (a village in Srimangal) before seeking refuge in the Jagannathpur Kingdom. The King of Jagannathpur, Raja Vijay Singh allowed Prabhakar to live in the Keshabpur village. Later, Prabhakar's son, Sambhu Das Dutta, is made a minister under Vijay Singh. After the defeat of the Jagannathpur Kingdom by the Baniyachong Raja Habib Khan, the Dutta family decided to stay away from politics in order to protect themselves. Sambhu's son, Radha Madhab Dutta engaged himself in Sanskrit and Bengali literature. He translated Jayadeva's Gita Govinda into the Bengali language in addition to writing and composing famous songs and poems.

Early life
Dutta was born on May 26, 1833 into a Bengali Kayastha zamindar family in the village of Keshabpur in Jagannathpur, which is located in present-day Sunamganj District, Bangladesh. As the youngest son of the Bengali Hindu lyricist Radha Madhab Dutta, Dutta displayed a musical temperament from childhood. The early death of his father led Dutta to seek the discipleship and initiation of religious mentors like Raghunath Goswami.  Dutta's Vaishnavism (worship of Krishna) shaped his musical work and led him to a life of asceticism; he lived for some time in a house that amounted to little more than a seven-square-foot of mud-hut. He studied Shakta, Vaishnavism, Shaiva and Sahajiya doctrines and started performing sadhana-bhajan according to Sahajiya. Dutta was also heavily influenced by the Sufism that infuses Baul culture, and was in touch with contemporary Bengali Muslim poet Hason Raja.

Cultural influence
Radharaman Datta wrote and composed over 3,000 songs in the Baul tradition and was known in particular for his "Geets" and "Dhamal" songs - compositions to traditional dance forms. He has been cited as the creator of the Dhamail art form.  Dutta's compositions are performed today in weddings all over Bangladesh.  Many popular Bengali songs of today were written originally by Radha Raman and his songs are sung by modern professional musicians in Bangladesh and in West Bengal, India.

Dutta's most popular song, "Bhromor Koio Giya", was copied by Romanian singer Liviu Mititelu, for which it is called 'Vorbesc Cu tine Nu Ma Auzi'. This cover version was also a copy of the composition by Armeen Musa's first version of the original song.

Tajik singer Noziya Karomatullo (Нозияи Кароматулло) has also covered it in Tajik. The title of her cover version is Kujo Kujo.

Personal life
In 1275 BS (1868-1869 AD), he married Gunamayi Devi. She was the daughter of Nandakumar Sen Adhikari, a descendant of Sen Shivananda who was a disciple of Krishna Chaitanya. Her home village was Adpasha in present-day Ward 8, Amtail, Moulvibazar. Bipin Bihari Dutta was their only surviving child at the time of Dutta's death, with his three other children and wife dying in his lifetime.

Death and legacy
On 10 November 1915, Dutta died in his own house which became his samadhi (shrine). Following his death, his disciples lit candles in the shrine everyday - a tradition which has been maintained to this day.

Notable famous songs by Radharaman
 Shyam Kalia Shuna Bondhu Re
 Bhromor Koio Giya
 Kare Dhekabo Moner Dhukko Go
 Sham Chikon Kalia
 Bolo Go Bolo Go Shoki
 Mone Nai Mone Nai
 Jole Jaio Na Go Rai
 O Bashi Re
 Sham Na Ki Choli la
 Jole Gia Chilam Shoi
 Ami Robo Na Robo Na Grihe
 Kalay Pran Ti Nilo (Bashi Ti Bajaiya)
 Amar Bondhu Doyamoy
 Jugol Milon Hoilo Go
 Pap Ar Punno, Kori Tare Manno
 Ke Tore Shikhailo Radhar Namti Re
 Amar Golar Har Khule Ne Ogo Lalite
 Amare Ashibar Kotha Koiya

References

1833 births
1915 deaths
People from Jagannathpur Upazila
Bengali musicians
Bengali singers
Bengali-language lyricists